National Route 371 is a national highway of Japan connecting Kawachinagano, Osaka and Kushimoto, Wakayama in Japan, with a total length of 199.6 km (124.03 mi).

References

National highways in Japan
Roads in Nara Prefecture
Roads in Osaka Prefecture
Roads in Wakayama Prefecture